Iabloana is a commune in Glodeni District, Moldova. It is composed of two villages, Iabloana and Soroca.

References

Communes of Glodeni District